This is a list of Princes of Saxe-Coburg and Gotha from the accession of Ernest I to the throne of the Duchy of Saxe-Coburg and Gotha in 1826. Individuals holding the title of prince will usually also be styled "His Highness"  (HH). The wife of a Saxon prince will usually take the title and style of her husband.

Styling of Princes
The title Prince of Saxe-Coburg and Gotha and Duke of Saxony and the use of the style "Highness" has generally been used by to the following persons:

Ducal Line
When Prince Albert married Queen Victoria their children where styled HRH, but Queen Victoria issued two letters patent, first in 1864 which stated that her male-line Grandchildren will be styled HRH and second 1898 which stated that children of the eldest son of the Prince of Wales will be styled HRH.

Koháry Line
When Prince Ferdinand August married Queen Maria II of Portugal and became King Ferdinand II of Portugal jure uxoris, he founded the House of Braganza-Saxe-Coburg and Gotha and their descents were to styled HRH.
When Prince Ferdinand Maximilian became Tsar Ferdinand I of Bulgaria in 1908, his descents were to be styled HRH.

Belgian Line
When Prince Leopold became King Leopold I of the Belgians in 1831, his descents were to be styled HRH.

List of Saxon princes since 1826

References

 
 
 
P
P
P
P